Oparopsis is a genus of  very small sea snails, marine gastropod molluscs in the family Cerithiopsidae.

Species
 Oparopsis floresi (Cecalupo & Perugia, 2014)
 Oparopsis hikimarum Cecalupo & Perugia, 2019
 Oparopsis tsuzukii Cecalupo & Perugia, 2019

References

 Cecalupo A. & Perugia I. (2015). Oparopsis, a replacement name for Australopsis Cecalupo & Perugia, 2014 (Mollusca: Gastropoda), non Australopsis Hinz-Schallreuter, 1993 (Crustacea: Ostracoda). Novapex. 16(2): 63
 Cecalupo A.; Perugia I. (2014). Cerithiopsidae and Newtoniellidae (Gastropoda: Triphoroidea Gray) from French Polynesia area (South Pacific Ocean). Novapex. 15(1): 1-22.

External links
 

Cerithiopsidae
Gastropod genera